Saint-Vit may refer to:

 Saint-Vit, Saint-Vit, Doubs, Bourgogne-Franche-Comté, France
 Canton of Saint-Vit, Doubs, Bourgogne-Franche-Comté, France
 Saint Vitus, in French

See also
 Saint Guy (disambiguation)